Fredonia High School is a high school in Fredonia, Arizona under the jurisdiction of the Fredonia-Moccasin Unified School District, whose only other school is the K-8 Fredonia Elementary. Nick Bartlett, the principal, is also district superintendent.

Notable alumni
John Garcia, star of National Geographic Channel's DogTown series, trainer for Best Friends Animal Society

References

Public high schools in Arizona
Schools in Coconino County, Arizona